Maskal is a rural locality (a village) in Bolshekochinskoye Rural Settlement, Kochyovsky District, Perm Krai, Russia. The population was 36 as of 2010. There are 3 streets.

Geography 
Mitino is located 21 km northeast of Kochyovo (the district's administrative centre) by road. Bolshaya Kocha is the nearest rural locality.

References 

Rural localities in Kochyovsky District